Reylene Pearce briefly billed as Raelene Pearce and Rey Pearce, is an Australian actress, best known for her long-running role in the television drama series Prisoner as Phyllis Hunt. 

She appeared in the show for 141 episodes from 1979 to 1984, during which time the role had developed from a background bit part to a central character.

Post Prisoner she had several guest roles in TV series Neighbours and  appeared in small roles in films an Australian including independent film "Moonlight & Magic" (2007) as Delilah, a breast cancer survivor.

Filmography

External links
 

Living people
Australian film actresses
Australian soap opera actresses
Year of birth missing (living people)
20th-century Australian actresses
21st-century Australian actresses